Portland, Oregon has a burgeoning craft distillery community. Many distilleries in Oregon are producing high end craft spirits. These spirits range from vodka, gin, whiskey, rum, brandy, eau de vie, grappa, and many others. Most distilleries in Oregon are members of the Oregon Distillers Guild, a consortium of craft distilleries in Oregon.

Distilleries

Clear Creek Distillery
Eastside Distilling
Edgefield Distillery
Freeland Spirits
House Spirits Distillery
McMenamins
New Deal Distillery
Rogue Spirits
Stone Barn Brandyworks

See also
 List of companies based in Oregon

Notes

References

Seattle Times, Thursday, June 19, 2008
Burning Still | Distilling Community - Distilling community site based in the Portland metro area.

Portland, Oregon
American cuisine-related lists
Food and drink companies based in Portland, Oregon
Manufacturing companies based in Portland, Oregon

Portland, Oregon-related lists